Chan Chwa is a tambon (subdistrict) of Mae Chan District, in Chiang Rai Province, Thailand. In 2016 it had a population of 7,104 people.

Administration

Central administration
The tambon is divided into 11 administrative villages (mubans).

Local administration
The area of the subdistrict is covered by the subdistrict municipality (thesaban tambon) Chan Chwa (เทศบาลตำบลจันจว้า).

References

External links
Thaitambon.com on Chan Chwa

Tambon of Chiang Rai province
Populated places in Chiang Rai province